Umar Qaid is a 1975 Hindi-language action film, produced by V.K.Sobti on Gautam Pictures banner and directed by Sikandar Khanna. Starring Sunil Dutt, Jeetendra, Vinod Mehra, Moushumi Chatterjee, Reena Roy  and music composed by Sonik-Omi.

Plot
Vinod Verma is a customs officer who lives festively with his mother, sister Anju, and brother Chintu  and falls for a girl Dr. Bharati. Vinod is a die-hard to hoodlums KK / Kamalkanth & Jakha. So, they appoint a daredevil ruffian Raja  as a white knight who succeeds in several tasks courageously. Raja dotes on his blind sister Laxmi. On a mission, KK backstabs Raja, molests, and kills Laxmi when Raja avenges him. Here, Vinod is surprised to find KK as Bharati’s uncle who seeks to bribe him which results in a furious dispute. Forthwith, Raja slays out KK, wherein, Vinod is arraigned and penalized with life imprisonment. In jail, he befriends a prisoner Akbar. Meanwhile, Raja espouses his love for Reena. Just after, he is incriminated by Jakha and sentenced. Initially, Raja & Vinod antagonizes afterward Raja bows down to Vinod’s benevolence. Then, Raja as unbeknownst pledges to prove his innocence and Akbar also fuses them. So, they abscond when Akbar sacrifices his life while guarding the two, and Raja & Vinod split. Destiny takes Raja to Bharati’s residence where he realizes himself as a malefactor. In tandem, he rescues Anju from Jakha. Further, aware of the truth Vinod revolts on Raja but realizes his virtue from Anju. Finally, Raja surrenders, he is convicted of life imprisonment when Vinod’s family takes responsibility, Reena.

Cast
Sunil Dutt as Raja		
Jeetendra as Akbar		
Vinod Mehra as Vinod		
Moushumi Chatterjee as Dr. Bharati	
Reena Roy as Reena		
Anju Mahendru as Anju
Sanjana as Laxmi		
Asrani
Om Shivpuri
Sulochana as Vinod's mother
Dev Kumar
Krishan Dhawan	
Manmohan
Ram Mohan
Dinesh Hingoo
Raja Duggal
Master Satyajeet as Chintu

Soundtrack

External links
 

1975 films
1970s Hindi-language films
Films scored by Sonik-Omi